Fred: The Show (stylized as FЯED: THE SHOW) is an American comedy television series, created by Lucas Cruikshank that originally aired on Nickelodeon in the United States from January 16 to August 3, 2012. Lucas Cruikshank, Daniella Monet, Jake Weary, Siobhan Fallon Hogan, and Stephanie Courtney reprise their roles from Fred: The Movie and Fred 2: Night of the Living Fred. A series preview aired on January 16, 2012, and the show officially premiered on February 5, 2012. Fred: The Show came to production after the success of Fred 2: Night of the Living Fred. The show was cancelled after one season due to low ratings and poor reviews from critics. It is considered one of the worst television shows ever made, although it has developed a cult following.

Synopsis
The show follows the adventures of Fred Figglehorn (Lucas Cruikshank) aged 17 years old in his daily life with crazy schemes and adventures.

Cast

Main
Lucas Cruikshank as Fred Figglehorn / Derf / Fredo / Evil Fred / Bagel Fredrick
Jake Weary as Kevin
Siobhan Fallon Hogan as Hilda Figglehorn (Fred's Mom) / Fred's Grandmother
Daniella Monet as Bertha
Stephanie Courtney as Janet

Recurring
Carlos Knight as Diesel
Rachel Crow as Starr
Pat Crawford Brown as Mrs. Haberstan
Ryan Potter as Bryan: Fred's Best Friend
Gracie Dzienny as Holly

Episodes

Broadcast
Fred: The Show premiered on January 16, 2012, in the United States. The show first began showing in Canada on September 3, 2012. In Australia the premiere was on August 17, 2012. The program premiered in the United Kingdom and Ireland on August 12, 2012, on Nickelodeon. It also aired on VIVA in April 2013.

Reception
Like the films, Fred: The Show was critically panned and was considered to be one of the worst television series of all time. Common Sense Media gave the show 1 out of 5 stars and stated that Fred: The Show had "More of the same absurdity from obnoxious YouTube star." Despite the negative reviews, the show attracted 3.7 million viewers with a sneak peek that aired on January 16. A month later, the series premiered with 3.1 million viewers (a 16% drop) However, viewers dropped a further 23% to 2.4 million for the show's second episode - which aired just four days later.

References

External links

Official website

2012 American television series debuts
2012 American television series endings
2010s American comedy television series
American fantasy television series
Television series based on Internet-based works
English-language television shows
2010s Nickelodeon original programming
Television series about teenagers